Nickimerus is a genus of beetles in the family Megalopodidae. It contains only one species, Nickimerus setosus, found in Brazil.

References

Megalopodidae genera
Monotypic Chrysomeloidea genera
Beetles of South America